Khaled is a Canadian drama film, directed by Asghar Massombagi and released in 2001. It is the story of a ten-year-old boy who tries to conceal the death of his mother.

The film premiered at the 2001 Toronto International Film Festival.

Plot
Khaled (Michael D'Ascenzo) lives in a Toronto housing project with his mother, who is French Canadian and chronically ill. His father is Moroccan and abandoned the family when Khaled was young. One day his mother dies, but Khaled attempts to carry on life as normal. His life deteriorates as his landlord harasses him for overdue rent, and neighbors begin to notice the smell of decay from his apartment.

Awards
At TIFF the film received an honorable mention for the FIPRESCI International Critics Award, and it was later named to TIFF's annual year-end Canada's Top Ten list for 2001.

At the 23rd Genie Awards in 2003, Mel M'Rabet received a nomination for Best Original Song, for "Ab (Father)".

Massombagi won the Best Director Award for the film at the 37th Karlovy Vary International Film Festival, and the First Time Filmmaker Award at the ReelWorld Film Festival.

References

External links

2001 drama films
2001 films
Films directed by Asghar Massombagi
Films set in Toronto
Canadian drama films
Canadian Film Centre films
2000s Canadian films